Mitromorpha unilineata is a species of sea snail, a marine gastropod mollusk in the family Mitromorphidae.

Description

Distribution
This marine species occurs off the Philippines and Indonesia

References

Description of four new shallow water Mitromorpha species from the western Pacific (Gastropoda: Mitromorphidae). Visaya 4(2):: 21–27

External links
 MNHN, Paris: Mitromorpha unilineata (holotype)

unilineata
Gastropods described in 2014